Reichental is a village in Baden-Württemberg, Germany. It is administratively part of the town of Gernsbach in the Rastatt district.

Geography 

The village is located south-east of Gernsbach on the Reichenbach stream, a tributary of the Murg River. The hamlet of Kaltenbronn to the south is part of Reichental.

History 
The first documented mention of Reichental is as 'Richental' in the year 1339–1340. On January 1, 1975, Reichental was incorporated into the town of Gernsbach

References

Villages in Baden-Württemberg